Miodrag Kostić (Serbian Cyrillic: Миодраг Костић; born on 25 August 1959) is a Serbian businessman. Kostić is the founder and owner of MK Group, a diversified holding company focusing primarily on agribusiness. As of 2014, he is the 2nd richest man in Serbia, right after Miroslav Mišković, with an average net worth of 520 million euros.

Early life and education
Kostić was born on 25 August 1959 in Vrbas, SFR Yugoslavia. Kostić graduated from the Faculty of Economics at the University of Novi Sad at the Department of Information Technology in 1983.

Professional career
In 1983, he began a private business – initially as the owner of a private company for trade, import-export and manufacturing activities which in 1995 grew into MK Group. Since 2000, MK Group has managed sugar factories (factories Pećinci, Vrbas, Kovačica), more than 10 agribusiness enterprises, trade and warehouse complexes ("Granex-port", "Žito Bačka").

As of December 2017, Kostić’s MK Group has a total of 29 companies within its holding, with most of them being in Vojvodina. MK Group performs a variety of services, such as agribusiness, wholesale, real estate and banking. Some of the most notable subsidiary companies include Carnex Vrbas (meat industry), Sunoko (sugar industry), Agroglobe (fertilizing and wholesale of agriculture products), PIK-Bečej (agribusiness) and others.

Kostić is also the President of the Management Board of AIK Banka which, in June 2019, fully took over the ownership of Gorenjska Banka and thus successfully completed the takeover process in Slovenia. Being the first bank from Serbia to enter the European Union market, AIK Banka has confirmed its plans for further regional expansion.

In June 2020, Kostić’s MK Group completed the process of acquisition of 67% of the shares of Victoria Group. With the integration of Victoria Group member companies, Sojaprotein, Victoria Oil, Victoria Logistic, Luka Bačka Palanka and VZS Stočna hrana, MK Group has acquired the status of the majority owner, while the previous shareholders Milija Babovic and Apsara Limited remained minority owners.

In June 2020, Miodrag Kostić’s company completed the acquisition of the Slovenian branch of Heta Asset Resolution. At the end of 2019, MK Group was selected as the best bidder in the tender, meeting the formal requests for payment and purchase with the official approval of the Public Agency of the Republic of Slovenia for Protection of Competition and the approvals of the Competition Protection Commissions of Serbia and Montenegro.

Kostić Family Foundation
Kostić founded the Kostić Family Foundation in June 2013 with his mother Roksanda. He gave their family home as a present to the Provincial Institute for Protection of Health of Children and Young People of Vojvodina in Novi Sad and the National Association of Childhood Cancer Parents of Serbia for their exclusive use.

Kostić transferred the ownership of the house to the Provincial Government of Vojvodina, which is responsible for using the house solely for the proposed purpose. The house has 1400 square meters and 16 acres of outdoor property.

Awards and recognition

 1998. One of the best ranked on The list of the most successful businessmen in Serbia,
 1998. One of the best ranked on The list of the most successful citizens of Novi Sad,
 1999. One of the best ranked on The list of the most successful businessmen in Serbia,
 2001. One of the best ranked on The list of the most successful citizens of Novi Sad,
 2001. First ranked on The list of the most successful businessmen in Serbia,
 2002. Businessman of the Year, the Association of Journalists of Serbia,
 2003. The most successful entrepreneur, the best private company in Serbia and the most popular citizen of Novi Sad,
 2005. One of the best ranked on the list of the most successful businessmen in Serbia
 2007. One of the best ranked on the list of The most successful entrepreneurs and managers of Serbia,
 2008. First ranked on the list of the most successful businessmen in Serbia
 2009. "Belgrade Winner" Award for the entrepreneur of the year in Serbia
 2009. PKB Corporation Award for the businessman of the year in Serbia
 2011. Award for the "Best Manager of Southeastern and Central Europe" from the European Association of Managers
 2013. "Planet Business" Award to the President of MK Group, Miodrag Kostić, for years of successful management of the company
 2015. Miodrag Kostić won the Medal of Honour Award as a sign of appreciation for his long-term support for SOS Children's Village
 2015. Miodrag Kostić won the Laureate Award for the Special Development of Entrepreneurship in Serbia from Mokra Gora School of Management
 2017. Serbian Association of Economists and the Serbian Association of Corporate Directors awarded Miodrag Kostić for outstanding contributions in the field of business economics and management
 2019 Miodrag Kostić won the Golden Sign Award of the Red Cross of Serbia for exceptional humanitarian work

Memberships and functions
Kostić is the President of the Board of Directors of AIK Banka and for the second term – the President of the Serbian business club "Privrednik" which gathers 40 most successful entrepreneurs in Serbia. "Privrednik" cooperates with chambers of commerce and business associations in the country and abroad and the Government of the Republic of Serbia to improve entrepreneurship and management in Serbia and attract foreign investors.

He is also a member of numerous local and international business associations such as AmCham, British-Serbian Chamber of Commerce, Serbian-Italian Business Council, Swiss-Serbian Business Association, Serbian Association of Managers (SAM), National Alliance for Local Economic Development (NALED), etc.

He was also politically active, serving as the General Director of Serbia's Democratic Party from 1996 until the overthrow of Milošević on 5 October 2000.

References

External links
 MK Group

1959 births
Living people
People from Vrbas, Serbia
20th-century Serbian businesspeople
Serbian billionaires